Baseline magazine is a magazine devoted to typography, book arts and graphic design (not to be confused with the information technology magazine of the same name that is published by QuinStreet).

History

Since Baseline 19, which appeared in 1995, Baseline has been published by Bradbourne Publishing, co-edited by Mike Daines and Hans Dieter Reichert and art-directed by HDR Visual Communication. It is characterized by its large format, sumptuous art and double cover. It has won several major international design awards in the USA, Europe and Japan. The magazine is featured in several academic publications (i.e. Philip Megg's History of Graphic design and Idea magazine).

Before issue 19, publishers, editors, magazine dimensions and quality varied as the magazine evolved from a small format booklet that first appeared in 1979. Early editors included Mike Daines (Baselines 1–3), Tony Bisley (Baseline 4), Geoffrey Lawrence (Baseline 5) and Erik Spiekermann (Baselines 6, 7). The first full-color Baseline appeared as issue 8. Baseline 10 expanded the dimensions of the magazine from 8¼ x 11¾ to 10½ x 14¼. Baseline assumed its current size of 9¾ x 13¾ with Baseline 14.

The first four issues of Baseline were published by TSI (Typographic Systems International Ltd.). Following TSI, issues 5–18 had been published by Letraset, a graphics product company, but as the magazine flourished Letraset faced difficult times. Mike Daines, Jenny Daines and Hans Dieter Reichert, Veronika Reichert formed Bradbourne Publishing Ltd. and bought the magazine from Letraset in 1994.

See also
Communication Arts
Graphis Inc.
Print (magazine)
Visible Language

References

External links
Baseline magazine website
Design team of Baseline see HDR Visual Communication

Visual arts magazines published in the United Kingdom
Magazines established in 1979
Typography
Biannual magazines published in the United Kingdom
Design magazines